In the fields of machine learning, the theory of computation, and random matrix theory, a probability distribution over vectors is said to be in isotropic position if its covariance matrix is equal to the identity matrix.

Formal definitions 
Let  be a distribution over vectors in the vector space .
Then  is in isotropic position if, for vector  sampled from the distribution,

A set of vectors is said to be in isotropic position if the uniform distribution over that set is in isotropic position. In particular, every orthonormal set of vectors is isotropic.

See also 

 Whitening transformation

References 
 

Machine learning
Random matrices